Kiruba Munusamy is a human rights lawyer and Dalit activist. She works on caste discrimination and gender violence cases.
She is practising in the Supreme Court of India. She is the founder-executive director of Legal Initiative for Equality.

References

Indian women activists
Indian activists
Living people
Year of birth missing (living people)